Jeff Berry is an American attorney and sports agent. He is co-head of baseball at CAA Sports.

Background
Berry was born in Owensboro, Kentucky. He attended the University of North Carolina at Charlotte, where he was a catcher on the baseball team. After graduating with a Bachelor of Science in business administration, Berry signed with the Boston Red Sox, and spent one season as a catcher in their minor league system. Following his playing career, Berry was a graduate assistant baseball coach at Oklahoma City University, from 1995 to 1998. While at OCU, he earned his Juris Doctor from the University's School of Law, graduating cum laude in May 1998. Berry is a member of the Oklahoma Bar Association and a certified agent with the Major League Baseball Players Association.

Sports agent career
Berry is a co-head of CAA Sports' Baseball division. Forbes ranked Berry as one of the world's most powerful sports agents and since its inception in 2006, CAA has negotiated more than $3 billion in multi-year player contracts, advised 56 first-round picks and represented four MVPs, five Cy Young winners and seven Rookies of the Year.

Berry also has a record as a fierce advocate for players, writing a memo in 2018 that outlined strategies for players to empower themselves in the labor battle. Berry told ESPN.com, "As advocates, our job is to fight for and protect player rights, and when necessary, try and help create solutions -- not pointing fingers of blame and hoping things get better. And I wholeheartedly believe there are viable solutions to the core labor issues facing the game that can be remedied to the benefit of players, clubs and fans."

Berry has been involved with multiple rule changes in baseball. Following Buster Posey's season-ending injury in May 2011, Berry lobbied Major League Baseball and the players' union to limit home-plate collisions, telling ESPN.com, "You leave players way too vulnerable. ... I don't know if this ends up leading to a rule change, but it should. The guy [at the plate] is too exposed. ... I'm going to call Major League Baseball and put this on the radar. Because it's just wrong." Eventually MLB added Rule 7.13 to protect catchers.

In 2014, word leaked that shortstop prospect Trea Turner was the player to be named in a trade between the San Diego Padres and Nationals but could not actually be traded, by rule, for six more months. Berry told foxsports.com, "Given the circumstances and the undoubtedly negative impact on Trea Turner, for the teams involved and Major League Baseball to endorse and approve this trade is not only unethical, but also goes against the very spirit of the Minor League Uniform Player Contract that players sign when they first enter professional baseball."  In May 2015, MLB revised its rules and allowed players to be traded in the fall after they were drafted.

In June 2015, Berry successfully appealed an eight-game suspension of client Will Smith (pitcher) of the Milwaukee Brewers for having a foreign substance on his arm, getting the suspension reduced.  Smith credited Berry for the victory, saying, "My agent did his homework and cracked down on it. I felt comfortable leaving the meeting very well-represented."

Berry has also helped enable trades for his clients to preferred destinations. Shortly after he told ESPN.com in December 2009 that Roy Halladay would not approve any trade after he reported to spring training, the Toronto Blue Jays dealt Halladay to the Philadelphia Phillies, who signed Halladay to a $60 million extension. In 2019, Berry said client J.T. Realmuto would not sign a long-term deal with the Miami Marlins, and by February, the Marlins traded Realmuto to the Phillies.

Personal
Berry and his wife Sarah have three children, two sons and a daughter. Berry is a frequent speaker at colleges, law schools and other events. In 2022, Berry was named to the Board of Directors of the V Foundation.

References

External links
Greenberg, Jon "Buehrle's Perfect Circle", "ESPN.com", Bristol, Connecticut, 24 July 2009. Retrieved on 2011-03-21.
Dinich, Heather "Posey, the consummate student-athlete, key to Florida State's success", "ESPN.com", Bristol, Connecticut, 15 April 2008. Retrieved on 2011-03-22.
Mullen, Liz "Baseball agent Close leaving CAA", Sports Business Journal, February 28, 2011
Mullen, Liz "Nontraditional model pays off for CAA Baseball" Sports Business Journal, April 9, 2012

Living people
Baseball people from Kentucky
People from Owensboro, Kentucky
1969 births
American sports agents